The Li-Fi Consortium is an international organization focusing on optical wireless technologies. 
It was founded by four technology-based organizations in October 2011. The goal of the Li-Fi Consortium is to foster the development and distribution of (Li-Fi) optical wireless technologies such as communication, navigation, natural user interfaces and others.

Status 
 the Li-Fi Consortium outlined a roadmap for different types of optical communication such as gigabit-class communication as well as a full featured Li-Fi cloud which includes many more besides wireless infrared and visible light communication.

References

External links 
 Website

Wireless
Wireless network organizations
Computer networking
Optical communications